Ebrahimabad (also Romanized as Ebrāhīmābād) is a village in Basharyat-e Gharbi Rural District, Basharyat District, Abyek County, Qazvin Province, Iran. At the 2006 census, its population was 408, in 95 families.

References 

Populated places in Abyek County